Ballyalton Court Cairn is a single court grave situated on a rock outcrop by the roadside 0.5 miles from Ballyalton village, which is 2.25 miles east of Downpatrick, County Down, Northern Ireland, at grid ref 531 448. The tomb contained human bones, flint implements and pottery now known as Ballyalton bowls.

References

External links
 Megalithomania – Photographs of Ballyalton Court Tomb
 Irish Antiquities – Photographs of Ballyalton Court Tomb

Archaeological sites in County Down
Megalithic monuments in Northern Ireland
Burial monuments and structures